Leni Stengel (September 12, 1901 – July 1, 1982) was a German-born actress who appeared on Broadway, on television, and in films, through the 1920s to 1950s.

Early life
She was born in Berlin, Germany, and was a grandniece of the German composer Friedrich von Flotow.

Career

Her work in films includes Half Shot at Sunrise (1930), Cracked Nuts (1931), Beau Ideal (1931), The Animal Kingdom (1932), and Hollywood Speaks (1932). She worked with Buster Keaton in Casanova wider Willen ("The Reluctant Casanova", 1931), the German version of Parlor, Bedroom and Bath (1931). 

In television, she appeared in Lux Video Theatre, "Ti Babette" (1953), "Legacy of Love" (1952); Police Story, "Detective Sergeant, Martin Stephens" (1952); Lights Out, "Carmelita" (1951), The Clock, "Accident on Canigou" (1951). 

On Broadway, she appeared in Princess Turandot (1926, fantasy), These Few Ashes (1928, comedy), Tovarich (1936, comedy), and Swan Song (1946, her final Broadway appearance). 

In her films and radio performances with comedy duo Wheeler & Woolsey, such as Half Shot at Sunrise (1930) and Cracked Nuts (1931), she worked as the straight man and romantic interest with Robert Woolsey, as Dorothy Lee did with Bert Wheeler.

In Half Shot at Sunrise, they share a comic dance routine, during which she tears off most of Woolsey's doughboy uniform, until he ends up in his skivvies, posing in a fountain.

Later life
She died in 1982 in New York City, New York, USA.

Partial filmography and television credits

1952-1953: Lux Video Theatre (TV series), "Ti Babette" (1953), "Legacy of Love" (1952)
1952: Police Story (TV series), "Detective Sergeant, Martin Stephens"
1951: Lights Out (TV series), "Dark Image"
1951: The Clock, "Accident on Canigou" (1951)
1934: Art Trouble (short), as Girl at nightclub, with Shemp Howard
1934: Henry the Ache (short), with Shemp Howard 
1933: Kickin' the Crown Around (short), as The Queen, with Clark and McCullough
1933: The Barbarian, as Ilsa, a German Tourist
1933: Luxury Liner (1933 film), as Slattern (uncredited) 
1932: The Animal Kingdom, as Franc Schmidt, an artist
1932: Hollywood Speaks, as Mrs. Landau 
1932: Man About Town (1932 film), as Countess Vonesse 
1931: Husband's Holiday, as Molly Saunders 
1931: The Beloved Bachelor, as Julie Stressman 
1931: Casanova wider Willen, German version of Parlor, Bedroom and Bath, with Buster Keaton 
1931: The Road to Reno, as Mrs. Stafford Howes
1931: Cracked Nuts, as Queen Carlotta
1931: Beau Ideal, as Zuleika
1930: Half Shot at Sunrise, as Olga, with Wheeler & Woolsey

References

https://archive.today/20130201044323/http://www.reelz.com/person/172832/leni-stengel/
https://archive.org/details/Animal_Kingdom

External links

1901 births
1982 deaths
German emigrants to the United States
American film actresses
American radio actresses
American stage actresses
American television actresses
20th-century American actresses